Xylodromus testaceus is a species of brownish coloured rove beetle in the Omaliinae subfamily that can be found in Austria, Belgium, Czech Republic, Denmark, France, Germany, Hungary, Italy, Poland, Romania, Russia, Slovakia, Spain, Sweden, the Netherlands, Ukraine, and all of the republics of former Yugoslavia (except for Slovenia). It can also be found in the Near East.

References

Beetles described in 1840
Beetles of Europe
Omaliinae